SS Sardinia may refer to:

Ship names